Hope in a Darkened Heart is a 1986 album by English singer Virginia Astley, produced, primarily, by Japanese musician and composer Ryuichi Sakamoto.  The album is noted for featuring former Japan singer David Sylvian on the track "Some Small Hope" and for an alternate version of "A Summer Long Since Passed", which was originally included on Astley's From Gardens Where We Feel Secure album.  An additional track, "Le Song (A Day, A Night)", along with lyrics and a biography is available on the Japanese issue.

The tracks "Some Small Hope" and "Charm" were released as singles but were not commercially successful.  Two further tracks, "Love's a Lonely Place to be" and "Darkness Has Reached its End", had been issued some years before the album's release but likewise had no impact on the singles chart.

On December 25, 2020, Caroline Polachek and Lauren Auder released a cover version of “Some Small Hope” with all benefits going to a homelessness charity in Los Angeles. Polachek described Virginia Astley’s music as “one of my deep favorites... such an inspiration to me.”

Track listing
 "Some Small Hope"
 "A Father"
 "So Like Dorian"
 "I'm Sorry"
 "Tree Top Club"
 "Charm"
 "Love's a Lonely Place to be"
 "A Summer Long Since Passed"
 "Darkness Has Reached its End"
 Japanese edition bonus
 "Le Song (A Day, A Night)"

References

1986 albums
Virginia Astley albums
Albums produced by Jon Astley